The Shay locomotive is a geared steam locomotive that originated and was primarily used in North America. The locomotives were built to the patents of Ephraim Shay, who has been credited with the popularization of the concept of a geared steam locomotive. Although the design of Ephraim Shay's early locomotives differed from later ones, there is a clear line of development that joins all Shays. Shay locomotives were especially suited to logging, mining and industrial operations and could operate successfully on steep or poor quality track.

Development 
Ephraim Shay (1839–1916), was a schoolteacher, a clerk in an American Civil War hospital, a civil servant, a logger, a merchant, a railway owner, and an inventor who lived in Michigan.

In the 1860s, he became a logger and wanted a better way to move logs to the mill than on winter snow sleds. He built his own tramway in 1875, on  gauge track on wooden ties, allowing him to log all year round. Two years later he developed the idea of having an engine sit on a flatcar with a boiler, gears, and trucks that could pivot. The first Shay only had two cylinders and the front truck was mounted normally while the rear truck was fixed to the frame and could not swivel, much as normal drivers on a locomotive. Shay experimented first with a chain drive from the engine through the floor to the truck axle. It is not known if he powered one or both axles, but he soon found that the chain drive was not practical and he next tried a belt drive. It did not take long for the idea to become popular.

Shay applied for and was issued a patent for the basic idea in 1881.  He patented an improved geared truck for his engines in 1901.

Lima Locomotive Works of Lima, Ohio built Ephraim Shay's prototype engine in 1880.
Prior to 1884, all the Shays Lima produced weighed  each and had just two cylinders.  In 1884, they delivered the first 3-cylinder (Class B) Shay, and in 1885, the first 3-truck (Class C) Shay. The success of the Shay led to a major expansion and reorganization of the Lima company. When Lima first received the Shay idea it was not impressed, until John Carnes influenced the company to use the idea, resulting in the classic Shay design.

In 1903, Lima could claim that it had delivered the "heaviest locomotive on drivers in the world", the first 4-truck (class D) Shay, weighing . The use of a two-truck tender was necessary because the poor water quality along the line meant that the locomotive had to carry enough water for a round trip.

Lewis E. Feightner, working for Lima, patented improved engine mounting brackets and a superheater for the Shay in 1908 and 1909.

After the basic Shay patents had expired, Willamette Iron and Steel Works of Portland, Oregon, manufactured Shay-type locomotives, and in 1927, Willamette obtained a patent on an improved geared truck for such locomotives.  These became known as Willamette locomotives. Since "Shay" was a trademark of Lima, strictly speaking it is incorrect to refer to locomotives manufactured by Willamette and others as "Shays". Six Shay Patent locomotives, known as Henderson-style Shays, were built by the Michigan Iron Works in Cadillac, Michigan.

Overview

According to Lima Locomotive Works in 1925, "The Shay Geared Locomotive has a wide and varied range of service, being used in industrial, quarry, contractors, logging, mining and plantation work; (also on branch lines and mountain sections of trunk-line railways). It is especially adapted to industrial railroads in and around large manufacturing plants. Its value as a switching engine is due to the rapidity with which it will accelerate a load and to its ability to spot cars in a minimum of time. It is designed to take any curve on which standard cars can be operated." The company emphasized its performance on "steep grades", "uneven track", and "track too light for a direct engine of the same axle load".

Shay locomotives had regular fire-tube boilers offset to the left to provide space for, and counterbalance the weight of, a two or three cylinder "motor," mounted vertically on the right with longitudinal drive shafts extending fore and aft from the crankshaft at wheel axle height.  These shafts had universal joints and square sliding prismatic joints to accommodate the swiveling trucks.  Each axle was driven by a separate bevel gear, with no side rods.

The strength of these engines lies in the fact that all wheels, including, in some engines, those under the tender, are driven so that all the weight develops tractive effort.  A high ratio of piston strokes to wheel revolutions allowed them to run at partial slip, where a conventional rod engine would spin its drive wheels and burn rails, losing all traction.

Shay locomotives were often known as sidewinders or stemwinders for their side-mounted drive shafts.  Most were built for use in the United States, but many were exported, to about 30 countries, either by Lima, or after they had reached the end of their usefulness in the US.

Classes

 Class A: two cylinders, two trucks.
 Class B: three cylinders, two trucks. Weight between  tons.
 Class C: three cylinders, three trucks.
 Class D: three cylinders, four trucks. These were no more powerful than Class C, but had greater fuel and water capacity, resulting in improved adhesion.

Two  Shays were built with two cylinders and three trucks.

Four Shays,  gauge, were built left-handed, all special ordered by the Sr. Octaviano B. Cabrera Co., San Luis de la Paz, Mexico.

Survivors

115 Shays survive today, some a combination of parts of two Shays. Herewith a partial list: 
 The Yosemite Lumber Company's #4 Shay is partially restored and is on continuous display at the Sierra Nevada Logging Museum in Arnold, California. It worked at the top of the El Portal Incline, bringing sugar pine logs to the top of the incline, where the loaded rail cars were lowered about 3000 feet in a mile and a half, picked up by a different railroad and taken to the mill.
 The Arizona State Railroad Museum foundation owns former Anaconda Copper Mining Shay No. 5, which was previously stored in Montana. Although it never operated in the state of Arizona, it was acquired by the ASRM to represent the Shays used by various logging and short line railroads in Northern Arizona, such as the Saginaw and Manistee Lumber Company. It has been displayed by the Grand Canyon Hotel in Williams since 2014.
 Mount Emily Lumber Company 1 is has been operated by the Oregon Historical Society for several years. Since 2022, Mount Emily Lumber 1 has been owned by the Oregon Rail Heritage Foundation of Portland, Oregon.
 Restored and on continuous outdoor display in downtown Cadillac, Michigan for free viewing is a Cadillac–Soo Lumber Company locomotive with tender. The official Michigan historical marker by it explains much.
 The oldest surviving Shay, serial number 122, built in 1884, is currently displayed in Redding California, at Turtle Bay Exploration Park.
 The oldest operational Shay is located at the Cass Scenic Railroad State Park in West Virginia as their locomotive No. 5. It was first bought in 1905 by the West Virginia Pulp & Paper Co. at Cass. Number 5 is in fact still running on its original rail since it first ran in 1905.
 The Allen County Museum in Lima, Ohio displays a two-truck, 3 foot gauge Shay which had served a local quarry, and is probably the survivor nearest to the factory where it was built in 1925. It was rescued in 1953 only hours before being cut up for scrap, and was restored at no cost by Baldwin-Lima-Hamilton.
 The Camino-Placerville & Lake Tahoe No. 2, a three-truck Shay, is on display at the Travel Town Museum in Los Angeles, California.
 The Roaring Camp & Big Trees Narrow Gauge Railroad in Felton, California, operates the No. 1 Dixiana (Class B, s/n 2593 of 1912) and the No. 7 Sonora (Class C, s/n 2465 of 1911).
 Railtown 1897 State Historic Park preserves a class C Shay, Sierra Railroad No. 2, and occasionally runs it as part of its excursion trains.
 The Colorado Railroad Museum holds two Shays, Nos. 12 and 14, which operated on the Georgetown Loop Railroad for about 20 years.
 The New Jersey Museum of Transportation at Allaire State Park is restoring the 36-inch gauge Ely-Thomas Lumber Company No. 6. This locomotive ran on the Pine Creek Railroad from around 1955 through 2002, when it was taken out of service for boiler work.

 The Yosemite Mountain Sugar Pine Railroad owns and operates two former West Side Lumber Company Shays, Nos. 10 and 15, on its line just south of Yosemite National Park.
 Stephen F. Austin State University has a Shay locomotive (s/n 2005 of 1907) on display outside of the Arthur Temple College of Forestry and Agriculture in Nacogdoches, Texas.
 The Canada Science and Technology Museum owns one operational engine constructed from two locomotives, numbered engines 3 and 4 built for the Merrill & Ring Lumber Co., Ltd and used in their forestry operations at Theodosia Arm on the British Columbia mainland. This Shay is operated by volunteers of the Bytown Railway Society
 Graham County Railroad No. 1925, (Class C, s/n 3256 of 1925), survives at the North Carolina Transportation Museum in Spencer, North Carolina. 1925 is the fastest Shay ever recorded, clocked at a speed of 18 mph during "The Great Shay Race" at Railfair '99. It ran at the museum from 1997 to 2005 when the engine needed more boiler work. Since then it has been stored in the roundhouse as a static exhibit, and the universal joints have been removed.
 Serial number 3345, a class C Shay built for New Mexico Lumber Company. in 1929, survives at the Hesston Steam Museum in Hesston, Indiana. This was the last narrow gauge Shay built. It was acquired by the LaPorte County Historical Steam Society and moved to the Hesston Steam Museum, where it was damaged in an engine house fire in 1985. It was rebuilt and resumed operation in 2006.

 West Side Lumber Company No. 9 (Class C, s/n 3199 of 1923) was purchased by the Midwest Central Railroad in 1966, and with a minor refurbishment in the mid 1990s, continued to operate at their southeastern Iowa location. The locomotive was used during the MCRR's three operating sessions (the Midwest Old Threshers' Reunion, Midwest Haunted Rails, and the North Pole Express). In January 2011, the MCRR and the Georgetown Loop Railroad entered into a 7 to 10-year agreement where the 9 has been refurbished by the GLRR staff. It went into revenue passenger service at the Georgetown Loop Railroad on July 14, 2012. It has since returned to Iowa in late summer 2019, and began service at the 2019 Reunion.
 The Illinois Railway Museum, the largest railroad museum in the United States, runs a three-truck three-cylinder Lima built in 1929, a veteran of the J. Neils Lumber Company.

 Meadow River Lumber Co. No.1 is the only Shay in the collection at the Steamtown National Historic Site in Scranton, Pennsylvania 
 The last production Shay, Western Maryland Railway No. 6 (s/n 3354 of 1945), still operates on the Cass Scenic Railroad. The second largest Shay ever built, this 162-ton Class C locomotive was in service only four years when it was retired and placed in the B&O Railroad Museum. In 1981 it was removed from static display, in exchange for a smaller Shay (ex- Cass Scenic No. 1) and an H. K. Porter 0-4-0T (Saint Elizabeth #4), Inc Porter locomotive, and placed in service on the Cass Scenic Railroad, as their No. 6. Nicknamed "Big 6", it has now served in tourist and enthusiast service for a longer period than it did for its original owners. It is the largest Shay currently in existence. Cass Scenic Railroad is also the home of the largest collection of operational geared steam locomotives in the world
 There are three 28-ton narrow gauge Class B Shay locomotives, Nos. 25, 26 and 31, restored at the Alishan Forest Railway in Taiwan. Most of the Alishan's Shays survive on display in Taiwan, although one (No. 14),  has been exported to Australia's Puffing Billy Railway.
 Locomotive No. 22 is on display at Jiji Railway Station in Jiji, Taiwan
 The Little River Railroad And Lumber Company 70-ton shay number 2147 resides at the company's museum in Townsend, Tennessee.

 The Cass Scenic Railroad is home to several more Shays other than the aforementioned No. 5 and No. 6. The CSRR own and operates Shay #11, built in 1923, went originally to Hutchinson Lumber Company, Feather Falls, California; this Shay is best known as the Feather River No. 3. No. 11, also a class C shay, weighs 103-tons. The CSRR also owns Shay No. 2, a Pacific Coast Shay constructed in July 1928 for the Mayo Lumber Company of Paldi, Vancouver Island, British Columbia. No. 2 is also the only Shay locomotive to have burned wood, coal, and oil in her lifetime; she is a C class Shay, and weighs 93 tons. The Cass Scenic has one other shay that runs, Shay No. 4; originally numbered 5, she was made for the Birch Valley Lumber Company, Tioga, West Virginia in 1922. Like the CSRR's non-operational Shay No. 7, No. 4 is a C-70 80-ton shay.
 The Railway Historical Society of Northern New York (RHSNNY) is home to the Class B Shay No. 8 "Livingston Lansing" which was willed to the museum by Mr. Lansing. It is on display at the RHSNNY museum in Croghan, N.Y., on the Lowville and Beaver River Railroad. It is not operational.
 Three Class B Shays are at the BC Forest Discovery Centre in Duncan, British Columbia. Shay No. 3262, built in 1924 was rebuilt in 1995.
 Goodman Lumber Company No. 9 is on display at Mid-Continent Railway Museum in North Freedom, WI
 The Longview Public Library in Longview, WA has a fully restored Shay on the library grounds.  During special events that is close to the Library and the Civic Center, the Shay is opened up for the public to walk through.  http://longviewlibrary.org/shay.php
 Shop number 2769, built in 1914 for the Great Northern Railway, is currently on display in a small park near the BNSF mainline in Columbia Falls, Montana.
 One Class C Shay is exhibited at Buenavista railway station in Mexico City, formerly belonged to Teziutlan Copper Co. as TCC-2, weighing 45 tons, with a wheel drive engaged for 29.5 inches, vertical cylinders 10 by 12 inches, a force transmission and crankshaft gears. It used wood as fuel until 1946, when it was adapted to burn oil. The Compañía Minera Autlán SA de CV donated this locomotive to Ferrocarriles Nacionales de México as a historical piece in October 1980.
 Abitibi Power and Paper Co. Shay No. 70, Shop No. 3298, built in 1924, hauled lumber for the Abitibi Power and Paper Co. for many years before being donated to the Town of Iroquois Falls where it currently sits in a small park. Originally built for the Tallassee Power Co. as the 2,713th Shay built. It was passed to five different companies before retiring.
 Lopez Sugar Corporation No. 10 is the only known extant example in the island of Negros in the Philippines. It is displayed in front of the company headquarters as of June 2022.

Images

References

Sources 
 Kyle Neighbors (1969) THE LIMA SHAYS ON THE GREENBRIER, CHEAT & ELK RAILROAD COMPANY ASIN B001M07YHO
 Michael Koch The Shay Locomotive: Titan of the Timber World Press; Limited ed edition (1971) ASIN B0006WIHIE
 Shay Locomotive Works Shay Geared Locomotives and Repair Parts Catalogue Periscope Film LLC (January 26, 2010) 
 Philip V. Bagdon Shay Logging Locomotive at Cass, West Virginia, 1901-1960 TLC Publishing (December 21, 2001) 
 The Lima Locomotive & Machine Company Shay Patent and Direct Locomotives: Logging Cars, Car Wheels, Axles, Railroad and Machinery Castings Periscope Film LLC (March 24, 2010) 
 Ranger, Dan. Pacific Coast Shay, Strong Man of the Woods. (Golden West Books, 1964)
 https://www.shaylocomotives.com/data/factsheet/sn-3298.htm

External links 

 Shay Locomotives.com - Comprehensive database and reference

 Lists of original, former and current owners
 Shay owners by A
 Shay owners by B
 Shay owners by C
 Shay owners by D
 Shay owners by E
 Shay owners by F
 Shay owners by G
 Shay owners by H
 Shay owners by I
 Shay owners by J
 Shay owners by K
 Shay owners by L
 Shay owners by M
 Shay owners by N
 Shay owners by O
 Shay owners by P
 Shay owners by Q
 Shay owners by R
 Shay owners by S
 Shay owners by T
 Shay owners by U
 Shay owners by V
 Shay owners by W
 No Shay owners by X
 Shay owners by Y
 Shay owners by Z

 List of known Shay survivors
 Geared Steam Locomotive Works' Shay pages
 VIDEO: 3 Shay Locos side by side at Cass Scenic Railroad SP. 
 VIDEO: Geared Shay Steam Locomotives at Cass Scenic Railroad
 http://www.ephraimshay.com 
 http://www.sciencetech.technomuses.ca/english/collection/shay.cfm 
 Ely-Thomas Lumber Company No. 6 in the New Jersey Museum of Transportation
  Questions/Answers about Shay locomotives

Geared steam locomotives
Articulated locomotives
Steam locomotive types
Freight locomotives